What Next is an Australian television panel game show which aired on Melbourne station ABV-2 from 1958 to 1959. The series aired live. The exact format of the series is unknown, as is the archival status of the program. The show was hosted by Bob Cornish, and featured two teams competing against each other.

References

External links

1958 Australian television series debuts
1959 Australian television series endings
1950s Australian game shows
Australian live television series
Black-and-white Australian television shows
English-language television shows
Australian Broadcasting Corporation original programming
Australian panel games